East Yorkshire is a county constituency for the House of Commons of the Parliament of the United Kingdom. It elects one Member of Parliament (MP) at least once every five years by the first-past-the-post electoral system. The constituency has been represented by Greg Knight of the Conservative Party since the 2001 general election.

History
The East Yorkshire constituency was created for the 1997 general election and replaced the Bridlington constituency. The Conservative MP for that seat since 1979, John Townend, won the new seat and held it until he retired at the 2001 general election. His successor, the current incumbent Greg Knight, had previously represented the marginal seat of Derby North from 1983 until he was defeated in the 1997 general election. To date it has been a Conservative safe seat and ranks 170th in terms of their share of the vote of their 631 candidates, with an approximately equally divided opposition in 2010.

Boundaries

1997–2010: The Borough of East Yorkshire.

2010–present: The District of East Riding of Yorkshire wards of Bridlington Central and Old Town, Bridlington North, Bridlington South, Driffield and Rural, East Wolds and Coastal, Pocklington Provincial, and Wolds Weighton.

Members of Parliament

Elections

Elections in the 2010s

Elections in the 2000s

Elections in the 1990s

See also
List of parliamentary constituencies in Humberside

References

Parliamentary constituencies in Yorkshire and the Humber
Constituencies of the Parliament of the United Kingdom established in 1997
Politics of the East Riding of Yorkshire